The Papora are a Taiwanese indigenous people. They lived primarily in the area around Taichung and the Taiwanese western coastal littoral.  During the Ming and Qing dynasties, the Dutch East India Company traded with the Papora and provide records of life among them. Not much is known about the history of the people of Papora, as records were destroyed in a mass genocide committed in 1670 by the Cheng Cheng-gong's forces following widespread resistance by Papora, Babuza, Taokas and Pazeh speaking peoples of the central plain.

Notable people
Jolin Tsai (born 1980), Taiwanese singer, has one fourth Papora blood.

See also
 Papora language
 Kingdom of Middag
 Taiwanese indigenous peoples

References

Taiwanese indigenous peoples

  Reprinted 1995, SMC Publishing, Taipei. .